Vandavasi taluk is a taluk of Tiruvannamalai district of the Indian state of Tamil Nadu. The headquarters is the town of Vandavasi.

Demographics
According to the 2011 census, the taluk of Vandavasi had a population of 335,507 with 167,480  males and 168,027 females. There were 1003 women for every 1000 men. The taluk had a literacy rate of 67.94. Child population in the age group below 6 was 16,017 Males and 15,486 Females.

References 

Taluks of Tiruvannamalai district